Mazukaleh Poshteh (also Romanized as Māzūkaleh Poshteh; also known as Māzokaleh, Māzokaleh Poshteh-ye Bālā, and Māzūkaleh Poshteh-ye Bālā) is a village in Bibalan Rural District, Kelachay District, Rudsar County, Gilan Province, Iran. At the 2006 census, its population was 583, in 150 families.

References 

Populated places in Rudsar County